Alyson Reed is an American dancer and actress.

Life and career
Alyson Reed was born in Fullerton and grew up in Anaheim, California. She began ballet at age 4, started performing in musicals at age 7, and was working professionally by age 12. Reed performed as Alice in Wonderland at the Disneyland theme park and was also a performer at Knott's Berry Farm. Reed attended Anaheim High School, where she graduated in 1976. Alyson played the lead role in the 1974 Servite High School Production of "Hello Dolly!" (Anaheim, Ca). An active student, Alyson Reed was a varsity songleader and played the role of Nancy in the school's stage production of Oliver! during her junior year. As a senior, Reed was the first female in school history to serve as Associated Student Body President, and played the title role in the school's stage production of Sweet Charity. In February 1978, she was in the short lived musical Barbary Coast. 

Reed made her Broadway debut in Dancin' in 1978. Additional Broadway credits include  "Oh Brother", Dance a Little Closer, Cabaret, A Grand Night for Singing, and Marilyn: An American Fable. She was nominated for the Tony Award for Best Featured Actress in a Musical for Cabaret and the Drama Desk Award for Outstanding Actress in a Musical for Marilyn. In 1992, she starred opposite Michael O'Keefe in the national touring company of A Few Good Men in the role of Lt. Cmdr. Galloway, and also toured as Cassie/Val in A Chorus Line, and Catherine in Pippin.  She has numerous regional credits and can be heard on various cast albums.
  
Reed's most notable screen role was Cassie in Richard Attenborough's film adaptation of A Chorus Line, and she also appeared in the comedy Skin Deep with John Ritter. Her many television credits range from: Modern Family, Mad Men, Grey's Anatomy and Bones back to Matlock, L.A. Law, Murder, She Wrote, Frasier, Law & Order, Without a Trace, ER, Judging Amy, Chicago Hope, The X-Files to  CSI: Crime Scene Investigation, Nip/Tuck, Crossing Jordan, Numb3rs, Boston Legal, NYPD Blue and Desperate Housewives.

She became known to younger viewers for the role of Ms. Darbus in the popular Disney Channel movie High School Musical and its sequels High School Musical 2 and High School Musical 3: Senior Year.

Reed lent her voice to the video game Diablo III, providing the spine-tingling voice of the witch Adria.

Select filmography

References

External links 
The Official Alyson Reed

Living people
Actresses from Anaheim, California
American female dancers
Dancers from California
American film actresses
American stage actresses
American television actresses
21st-century American women
Year of birth missing (living people)